was Japanese samurai warrior in the Sengoku period.  he is known as one of the "Twenty-Four Generals of Takeda Shingen".

In 1573, he fought at Battle of Mikatagahara against Tokugawa Ieyasu. 
In 1575, he was killed at the Battle of Nagashino against Oda-Tokugawa forces. 
His sons followed Takeda Katsuyori until his death at Temmokuzan in 1582

See also
 Tsuchiya clan

References

External links 
  "Legendary Takeda's 24 Generals" at Yamanashi-kankou.jp

Takeda retainers
Samurai
1544 births
1575 deaths